Andrea Mitchell Reports is a news show on MSNBC broadcast weekdays at 12 PM ET/9 AM PT hosted by Andrea Mitchell. She originally was an anchor under the MSNBC Live umbrella before getting her own distinct show. She is the NBC News Chief Foreign Affairs correspondent. While the show is based in Washington, D.C., it will typically go on location to where Mitchell is reporting for NBC News.

History
Andrea Mitchell's show featured special coverage of the DNC Convention in 2008.

In September 2008, Megan Garber of Columbia Journalism Review questioned whether or not Andrea Mitchell should be reporting on the economic downturn, due to possible conflicts of interests.

In September 2011, Mitchell announced to her audience on Andrea Mitchell Reports that she had breast cancer.

Subrata De was named the show's executive producer in January 2012, replacing Jennifer Suozzo, who became senior broadcast producer of NBC Nightly News.  De left MSNBC to join ABC News in June 2014.

A June 18, 2012, segment originally aired on MSNBC's Way Too Early with Willie Geist was reaired on Andrea Mitchell Reports and criticized for taking Mitt Romney's comments at a campaign stop in Pennsylvania out of context.

Substitute hosts
On March 2, 2009, Savannah Guthrie anchored while Andrea Mitchell was en route to Jerusalem, Israel. On some occasions when Mitchell is out the show is suspended and MSNBC Live airs in its place featuring rotating anchors.

NBC News congressional correspondent Luke Russert fills in for Mitchell. When a story is deemed as breaking news, MSNBC producers have the discretion to replace Mitchell with Breaking News Anchor Brian Williams.

International broadcasts
MSNBC and NBC News programming is shown for several hours a day on the 24-hour news network Orbit News in Europe and the Middle East. This includes Andrea Mitchell Reports.

References

External links
 

2008 American television series debuts
2000s American television news shows
2010s American television news shows
2020s American television news shows
MSNBC original programming
English-language television shows